The men's shot put event at the 1950 British Empire Games was held on 9 February at the Eden Park in Auckland, New Zealand.

Results

References

Athletics at the 1950 British Empire Games
1950